Somerniemi is a former municipality of Finland. It was incorporated to Somero in 1977, at the time in Häme Province, which then became part of the new Western Finland Province. Somerniemi was originally a chapel congregation within the larger municipality of Somero. According to historical tradition, the first chapel in Somerniemi was built in 1682, and the congregation received its first priest in 1695.

References 

Somero
Former municipalities of Finland
1977 disestablishments in Finland